The 2012 Seattle Cash Spiel was held from November 23 to 25 at the Granite Curling Club in Seattle, Washington as part of the 2012–13 World Curling Tour. The event was held in a triple knockout, and the purse for the event was $10,000, of which the winner will receive $2,600. In the final, Todd Birr of Minnesota defeated Brady Clark of Washington with a score of 7–4.

Teams
The teams are listed as follows. Though the event is listed on the men's World Curling Tour, one mixed team and one women's team are participating in the event.

Knockout results
The draw is listed as follows:

A event

B event

C event

Playoffs
The playoffs draw is listed as follows:

References

External links
Official website

2012 in curling
Curling in Washington (state)